The Architectural Services Department is a department of the Government of Hong Kong responsible for the design and construction of many public facilities throughout the territory. It is subordinate to the Works Branch of the Development Bureau and the current director is Mr. Tse Cheong Wo, Edward.

History
The origins of the Architectural Services Department lie in the Architectural Office, one of the sub-departments of the former Public Works Department (PWD). The PWD was founded in 1891, but the structure of the department at that time is reportedly unclear. The Architectural Office existed by 1939, and following the disruption in operations during the Japanese occupation, the unit was kept busy in the postwar years by rebuilding work. The 1948 annual report of the Public Works Department reported that 274 government buildings were repaired that year. During the 1960s the Architectural Office was heavily involved in the resettlement housing programmes, but these duties were divested to the Hong Kong Housing Authority upon its 1973 establishment.

The modern Architectural Services Department (abbreviated ASD or ArchSD) was founded in 1986, reporting directly to the Secretary of Lands and Works. Some of the most prolific clients of the department have been the Urban Council and Regional Council, and their successors the Leisure and Cultural Services Department and Food and Environmental Hygiene Department.

Significant projects (as architect)
 Edinburgh Place Ferry Pier (1957)
 Central Government Offices (1954–1959) 
 Queen Elizabeth Hospital (1963) 
 Murray Building (1969)
 Hong Kong Space Museum (1980)
 Prince Philip Dental Hospital (1981)
 Hong Kong Coliseum (1983)
 Supreme Court Building (1984)
 Kowloon Central Library (1985)
 Wanchai Tower (1985)
 Queensway Government Offices (1986)
 Hong Kong Railway Museum (1986)
 Sha Tin Town Hall complex (1987)
 Tuen Mun Town Hall complex (1987)
 Hong Kong Cultural Centre (1989) 
 Immigration Tower (1990)
 Revenue Tower (1990)
 Hong Kong Museum of Art (1991)
 Tai A Chau refugee detention centre (1991)
 Regional Council chambers and Regional Services Department headquarters (1991)
 Pamela Youde Nethersole Eastern Hospital (1992)
 Hong Kong Stadium (1994) with HOK Sport
 Kowloon Walled City Park (1995) 
 Siu Sai Wan Sports Ground (1996) 
 Hong Kong Institute of Education (1997) with P&T Architects
 Cheung Sha Wan Government Offices (1999)
 Sheung Shui Slaughterhouse (1999)
 Kwai Tsing Theatre (1999)
 Hong Kong Museum of Coastal Defence (2000)
 Hong Kong Central Library (2001)
 Stanley Municipal Services Building (2005) 
 Hong Kong Wetland Park Visitor Centre (2006)
 Tuen Mun Hospital Rehabilitation Block (2007)

Directors
 José Lei, 1986-1991
 Paul Jeremy Corser, 1991-1993
 Kenneth Chan, September 1993–April 1997
 Pau Shiu-hung (鮑紹雄), October 1997–2 November 2002
 Yue Chi-hang (余熾鏗), 3 November 2002 – 4 July 2009
 Marigold Lau Lai Siu-wan (劉賴筱韞), 5 July 2009 – 16 October 2011
 Leung Koon-kee (梁冠基), 17 October 2011 – 9 December 2017
 Mrs Sylvia Lam Yu Ka-wai (林余家慧), from 10 December 2017
 Ms Winnie Ho Wing-yin (何永賢), from 18 December 2020

Notes

 References

External links
 Architectural Services Department

Hong Kong government departments and agencies
Architecture in Hong Kong